Christoph Martin Wieland (5 September 1733 – 20 January 1813) was a German poet and writer. He is best-remembered for having written the first Bildungsroman (Geschichte des Agathon), as well as the epic Oberon, which formed the basis for Carl Maria von Weber's opera of the same name. His thought was representative of the cosmopolitanism of the German Enlightenment, exemplified in his remark: "Only a true cosmopolitan can be a good citizen."

Biography
Christoph Martin Wieland was born in Oberholzheim (now part of Achstetten), half of which then belonged to the Free Imperial City of Biberach an der Riss and the other half to Gutenzell Abbey in the south-east of the modern-day state of Baden-Württemberg.

His father, who was pastor in Oberholzheim and subsequently in Biberach, took great pains with his son's education.  From the town school of Biberach he passed on at the age of twelve to the Kloster Berge gymnasium, near Magdeburg. He was a precocious child, and when he left school in 1749 was widely read in the Latin classics and the leading contemporary French writers; amongst German poets his favourites were Brockes and Klopstock.

During the summer of 1750, he fell in love with a cousin, Sophie Gutermann, and this love affair inspired him to plan his first ambitious work, Die Natur der Dinge (The Nature of Things, 1752), a didactic poem in six books. In 1750 he went to the University of Tübingen as a student of law, but his time was mainly taken up with literary studies. The poems he wrote at the university—Hermann, an epic (published by F. Muncker, 1886), Zwölf moralische Briefe in Versen (Twelve Moral Letters in Verse, 1752), Anti-Ovid (1752)—are pietistic in tone and dominated by the influence of Klopstock.
 
Wieland's poetry attracted the attention of the Swiss literary reformer, J. J. Bodmer, who invited Wieland to visit him in Zürich in the summer of 1752. After a few months however, he felt little sympathy with Wieland as, two years earlier, he had felt himself with Klopstock, and the friends parted; but Wieland remained in Switzerland until 1760, spending the last year, at Bern where he obtained a position as private tutor. Here he became intimate with Jean-Jacques Rousseau's friend Julie de Bondeli.

Wieland's tastes had changed; the writings of his early Swiss years—Der geprüfte Abraham (The Trial of Abraham's Faith, 1753), Sympathien (1756), Empfindungen eines Christen (1757)—were still in the manner of his earlier writings, but with the tragedies, Lady Johanna Gray (1758), and Clementina von Porretta (1760)—the latter based on Samuel Richardson's Sir Charles Grandison—the epic fragment Cyrus (first five cantos, 1759), and the "moral story in dialogues", Araspes und Panthea (1760), Wieland, as Gotthold Lessing said, "forsook the ethereal spheres to wander again among the sons of men."  In Cyrus, he had been inspired by the deeds of Frederick the Great to write a poem exhibiting the ideal of a hero. Araspes und Panthea is based on an episode from the Cyropaedia of Xenophon.

Wieland's conversion was completed at Biberach, having returned in 1760 as director of the chancery. The monotony of his life here was relieved by the friendship of a Count Stadion, whose library in the castle of Warthausen, not far from Biberach, was well stocked with French and English literature. Wieland met again his early love Sophie Gutermann, who had become the wife of Hofrat La Roche, then manager of Count Stadion's estates.

In Don Sylvia von Rosalva (1764), a romance in imitation of Don Quixote, he held up to ridicule his earlier faith and in the Comische Erzählungen (1765) he gave his extravagant imagination only too free a rein.

More important is the novel Geschichte des Agathon (1766–1767), in which, under the guise of a Greek fiction, Wieland described his own spiritual and intellectual growth. This work, which Lessing recommended as "a novel of classic taste," marks an epoch in the development of the modern psychological novel. Of equal importance was Wieland's translation of twenty-two of Shakespeare's plays into prose (8 vols., 1762–1766); it was the first attempt to present the English poet to the German people in something approaching entirety. With the poems Musarion oder die Philosophie der Grazien (1768), Idris (1768), Combabus (1770), Der neue Amadis (1771), Wieland opened the series of light and graceful romances in verse which appealed so irresistibly to his contemporaries and acted as an antidote to the sentimental excesses of the subsequent Sturm und Drang movement. Musarion advocates a rational unity of the sensual and spiritual; Amadis celebrates the triumph of intellectual over physical beauty.
 
Wieland married Anna Dorothea von Hillenbrand (July 8, 1746 – November 9, 1801) on October 21, 1765. They had 14 children. Wieland's daughter Sophia Catharina Susanna Wieland (October 19, 1768 – September 1, 1837) married philosopher Karl Leonhard Reinhold (1757–1823) on May 18, 1785.

Between 1769 and 1772, Wieland was a professor of philosophy at the University of Erfurt. In his Verklagter Amor ("Cupid Accused") he defended amatory poetry; and in the Dialogen des Diogenes von Sinope (1770) he gave a general vindication of his philosophical views.

In 1772 he published Der goldene Spiegel oder die Könige van Scheschian, a pedagogic work in the form of oriental stories; this attracted the attention of Duchess Anna Amalia of Brunswick-Wolfenbüttel, and resulted in his appointment as tutor to her two sons, the Duke Karl August and his brother Prince Constantin, at Weimar. With the exception of some years spent at Ossmannstedt, where in later life he bought an estate, Weimar remained Wieland's home until his death.  Turning his attention to dramatic poetry, he wrote opera librettos such as Wahl des Hercules ("Choice of Hercules") and Alceste by Anton Schweitzer.

In 1773, he founded Der teutsche Merkur, which under his editorship (1773–1789) became the most influential literary review in Germany. His views, as exhibited therein, however, showed so much of the narrow conventional spirit of French criticism, that he was attacked by Goethe in the satire Götter, Helden und Wieland ("Gods, Heroes and Wieland"). This Wieland answered with great good nature, recommending it to all who were fond of wit and sarcasm. Goethe and Johann Gottfried Herder were soon drawn to Weimar, where the Duchess Anna Amalia formed a circle of talent and genius, later also joined by Friedrich Schiller.

Politically, Wieland was a moderate liberal who advocated a constitutional monarchy, a free press, and a middle path between extremes of left and right. At least three of his works, Geschichte des Agathon, Der goldene Spiegel oder die Könige van Scheschian, and Beiträge zur geheimen Geschichte des menschlichen Verstandes und Herzens, found themselves on the official Bavarian Illuminati reading list.

He was also a librettist for the Seyler theatrical company of Abel Seyler. Of his later writings the most important are the admirable satire on German provinciality — the most attractive of all his prose writings — Die Abderiten, eine sehr wahrscheinliche Geschichte (A very probable history of the Abderites, 1774), (translated into French by Antoine Gilbert Griffet de Labaume) and the charming poetic romances, Das Wintermärchen (1776), Das Sommermärchen (1777), Geron der Adelige (1777), Pervonte oder die Wünsche (1778), a series culminating with Wieland's poetic masterpiece, the romantic epic of Oberon (1780). In 1780 he created the singspiel Rosamunde with the composer Anton Schweitzer.

In Wieland's later novels, such as the Geheime Geschichte des Philosophen Peregrinus Proteus (1791) and Aristipp und einige seiner Zeitgenossen (1800–1802), a didactic and philosophic tendency obscures the small literary interest they possess. He also translated Horace's Satires (1786), Lucian's Works (1788–1789), Cicero's Letters (1808 ff.), and from 1796 to 1803 he edited the Attisches Museum which did valuable service in popularizing Greek studies. Wieland was also strongly influenced by the French fairy-tale vogue of the 18th century, he published a collection of tales entitled Dschinnistan (1786–1789), which included three original tales, 'Der Stein der Weisen' ('The Philosopher's Stone'), 'Timander und Melissa', and 'Der Druide oder die Salamanderin und die Bildsäule' ('The Druid or the Salamander and the Painted Pillar'). Wieland had a strong influence on the German literature of his time.

He died in Weimar.

Editions

 Wieland's Sämtliche Werke ("complete works") appeared in 1794-1802, 45 vols. Collections of Wieland's letters were edited by his son Ludwig (1815) and by H. Gessner (1815–1816); his Letters to Sophie Laroche by F. Horn (1820).
 Later Editions of Wieland's Sämtliche Werke: 1818-1828, 53 vols.,1839-1840, 36 vols., and 1853–1858, 36 vols.  Then 1879-1882 in 40 vols., edited by H. Düntzer. There are numerous editions of selected works, notably by Heinrich Pröhle in Kürschner's Deutsche Nationalliteratur (vols. 51-56, 1883–1887); by F. Muncker (6 vols., 1889); by W. Bolsche (4 vols., 1902).
 Gesammelte Schriften, Abt. I: Werke. Abt. II: Übersetzungen, ed. by Deutsche Kommission der Königlich Preußischen Akademie der Wissenschaften [since 1945 ed. by Deutsche Akademie der Wissenschaften zu Berlin; since 1969 ed. by Akademie der Wissenschaften der DDR by Hans Werner Seiffert], Berlin 1909–1975. Completed volumes with accompanying commentary: I/6, I/9, I/12-15, I/18, I/20-23, II/1-3; volumes without accompanying commentary: I/1, I/2, I/3, I/4, I/7, I/10, I/17, II/4, II/9-10; volumes missing: I/5, I/16, I/19, II/5-8. [critical edition]
 Wielands Briefwechsel, 20 volumes, ed. by Deutsche Akademie der Wissenschaften zu Berlin, Institut für deutsche Sprache und Literatur [since vol. 2, 1968 by Hans Werner Seiffert; since vol. 3, 1975 ed. by Akademie der Wissenschaften der DDR, Zentralinstitut für Literaturgeschichte by Hans Werner Seiffert; since vol. 7, 1992 ed. by Akademie der Wissenschaften Berlin by Siegfried Scheibe; since 1993 by Berlin-Brandenburgischen Akademie der Wissenschaften by Siegfried Scheibe], Berlin, 1963–2007.
 Wielands Werke. Historisch-kritische Ausgabe, edited by  Klaus Manger and Jan Philipp Reemtsma. Berlin/New York 2008 f. [critical edition]

Notes

Further reading
 J. G. Gruber, C.M. Wielands Leben (4 vols., 1827–1828)
 Heinrich Doring, C.M. Wieland (1853); Christoph Martin Wieland, ein biographisches Denkmal (1840)
 J. W. Loebell, C.M. Wieland (1858) 
 Heinrich Pröhle, Lessing, Wieland, Heinse (1877)
 L. F. Ofterdinger, Wielands Leben und Wirken in Schwaben und in der Schweiz (1877)
 R. Keil, Wieland und Reinhold (1885)
 F. Thalmeyr, Über Wielands Klassizität, Sprache und SM (1894)
 M. Doll, Wieland und die Antike (1896)
 K. Buchner, Wieland und die Weidmannsche Buchhandlung. Zur Geschichte deutscher Literatur und deutschen Buchhandels (1871)
 See also M. Koch's article in the Allgemeine deutsche Biographie (1897)
 C. A. Behmer, Sterne und Wieland (1899)
 J. M. R. Lenz, Vertheidigung des Herrn Wieland gegen die Wolken (1902)
 W. Lenz, Wielands Verhältnis zu Spenser, Pope und Swift (1903)
 L. Hirzel, Wielands Beziehungen zu den deutschen Romantikern (1904)
 E. Haman, Wielands Bildungsideal (1907)
 C. Elson, Wieland and Shaftesbury (1913)
 H. Behme, Heinrich von Kleist und C.M. Wieland (1914)
 V. Michel, C.M. Wieland, la formation et l'évolution de son esprit jusqu'en 1772 (1938)
 M. G. Bach Wieland's attitude toward woman and her cultural and social relations (1966)
 Jan Philipp Reemtsma, Das Buch vom Ich: Christoph Martin Wielands »Aristipp und einige seiner Zeitgenossen« (1993)
 Jan Philipp Reemtsma, Der Liebe Maskentanz: Aufsätze zum Werk Christoph Martin Wielands (1999)

References
 Elizabeth Barnes: "Loving with a Vengeance: Wieland, Familicide and the Crisis of Masculinity in the Early Nation". In: Milette Shamir und Jennifer Travis: Boys Don’t Cry? Rethinking Narratives of Masculinity and Emotion in the U.S. Columbia University Press: New York, 2002, S. 44–63.
 
 
 Giorgia Sogos: Christoph Martin Wieland alla corte della duchessa Anna Amalia. In: Ders. Stefan Zweig, der Kosmopolit. Studiensammlung über seine Werke und andere Beiträge. Eine kritische Analyse. Free Pen Verlag Bonn 2017, ISBN 978-3-945177-43-3.

External links

 
 
 
Der Teutsche Merkur, vols. 1773-89 are digitized (April 2003)
 
 
 
 
 
 
 
 
 
 
 
 
 
 
 

1733 births
1813 deaths
People from Biberach (district)
Achstetten
German translators
English–German translators
Latin–German translators
University of Tübingen alumni
Members of the Prussian Academy of Sciences
Corresponding members of the Académie des Inscriptions et Belles-Lettres
Academic staff of the University of Erfurt
German male non-fiction writers
Enlightenment philosophers
18th-century German translators